Tebupirimfos, also known as phostebupirim, is an organothiophosphate insecticide.  It is used on corn crops, including popcorn.

References

Additional resources
 

Acetylcholinesterase inhibitors
Organothiophosphate esters
Organophosphate insecticides
Pyrimidines
Isopropyl esters
Tert-butyl compounds
Ethyl esters